His Sister's Children is a 1911 American silent black and white comedy film produced by Vitagraph Company of America and distributed by General Film Company.

Cast
 Dolores Costello as Buster aka Budge - One of the Children
 Helen Costello as Boxer aka Toodle - One of the Children
 John Bunny
 Maurice Costello as Harry Burton - the Children's Uncle
 Rose E. Tapley as Helen Manton - Harry's Sweetheart
 Tefft Johnson as Harry's Sister's Husband
 Miss E. Dominicus as Harry's Sister

References

External links
 

American silent short films
American black-and-white films
Silent American comedy films
1911 comedy films
1911 films
Vitagraph Studios short films
General Film Company
1910s American films